Luis Francisco Grando (born 2 February 1987), known as Chico, is a Brazilian professional footballer who most recently played as a defensive midfielder or defender. He can also play as a left back.

Chico made professional his debut with Atlético-PR in 2–3 home defeat to Grêmio in the Campeonato Brasileiro on 12 November 2006. He scored first professional goal with Atlético-PR in a 3–3 away draw with Londrina in the Campeonato Paranaense on 1 February 2007.

Honours
Atlético Paranaense
Campeonato Paranaense: 2009

Coritiba
Campeonato Paranaense: 2013

References

External links
 rubronegro.net
 sambafoot.com
 CBF
 furacao.com
 atleticopr.com

1987 births
Living people
Brazilian footballers
Association football defenders
Association football midfielders
Club Athletico Paranaense players
Sociedade Esportiva Palmeiras players
Coritiba Foot Ball Club players
Goiás Esporte Clube players
FC Cascavel players
Gaziantepspor footballers
Antalyaspor footballers
Campeonato Brasileiro Série A players
Süper Lig players
Brazilian expatriate footballers
Expatriate footballers in Turkey
People from Pato Branco
Sportspeople from Paraná (state)